FC Karelia-Discovery is a Russian football team from Petrozavodsk. As of 2009, it plays in the Amateur Football League.

Team name history

 1935 — 1941, 1944 — 1991 — «Spartak»
 1992 — «Karelia»
 1992 — «Karelia-Asmaral»
 1993 — 1994 — «EDCI»
 1996 — «Karelia-EDCI»
 2001 — 2002 — «Karelia»
 2003 — «United Russia — Karelia»
 2003, 2006 — 2009 — «Karelia»
 2009 — «Discovery-Karelia»
 2009 — «Discovery»
 2009–present — «Karelia-Discovery»

See also
FC Karelia Petrozavodsk

External links
  Team history at KLISF

Association football clubs established in 1935
Football clubs in Russia
Sport in Petrozavodsk
1935 establishments in Russia